Palakkad North is a region in Palakkad city consisting of the northern suburbs of the city. These areas can be treated as both commercial and residential areas of the city. Many of the institutions of the city forms part of Palakkad North. There is a North Police Station located on Market Road, Vadakkanthara. The Palakkad North Police Station was formed and opened in the year 1913.

Suburbs
Akathethara 
Ayyapuram
Fort Maidan
Jainamedu
Kallekkad
Kallekulangara
Kalpathy 
Melamuri
Mepparamba
Mundur
Olavakkode
Pirayiri
Puthuppariyaram
Puthur
Railway Colony
Sekharipuram 
Vadakkanthara

Facilities
Map view of facilities in and around Palakkad

Things to do
Map view of things to do in and around palakkad

See also
 Palakkad South

References

 

 
Palakkad
Suburbs of Palakkad
Cities and towns in Palakkad district